is a Shinto shrine located in the city of  Tsugaru, Aomori Prefecture, Japan. The shrine is dedicated to  Inari Ōkami. Takayama Inari Shrine is notable for the many red torii that wind along its path. It is said that this shrine had already been established in the late 17th century. Next to the shrine is a memorial dedicated to American sailors who died in 1889 when full-rigged ship Cheseborough wrecked off the coast of Shariki Village (now a part of Tsugaru) during a typhoon.

References

Tsugaru, Aomori
Shinto shrines in Aomori Prefecture